On 28 June 1987, Iraq dropped mustard gas bombs on Sardasht, West Azerbaijan, Iran. In two separate bombing runs on four residential areas, the attack killed 130 people and injured 8,000. The gas attacks occurred during the Iran–Iraq War when Iraq frequently used chemical weapons against Iranian civilians and soldiers.

In 2006, a quarter of the town's 20,000 residents were still suffering severe illnesses from the attacks. The film Walnut Tree (2020) was inspired by the event.

Background

In 1986, the President of the Security Council of the United Nations stated that the Council members were "profoundly concerned by the unanimous conclusion of the specialists that chemical weapons on many occasions have been used by Iraqi forces against Iranian troops ... [and] the members of the Council strongly condemn this continued use of chemical weapons in clear violation of the Geneva Protocol of 1925, which prohibits the use in war of chemical weapons." The United States voted against the issuance of this statement.

Mustard gas is not considered a lethal agent but an incapacitating agent, causing only 3–5% mortality.

Immediate effects 

Because Sardasht was not considered a military target, the population was both unprotected and unprepared for a chemical weapons assault. Living close to the border and the war front, citizens had become accustomed to Iraqi bombardment with conventional weapons. However, people later told physicians that they did not know that the bombs carried chemical weapons; in fact, at first, they had been relieved when the bombs did not explode.

Due to the direction of the wind, the hospital and convalescent center were contaminated, and the few doctors and nurses who were working there had to leave. Two public baths were used for decontamination of the victims, and a small stadium was converted into a 150-bed medical facility. About 30 people, mostly young children and old people, died within a few hours of the attack due to severe respiratory problems.

Aftermath

Out of 12,000 inhabitants, according to official reports, 8,000 were exposed. Of the 4,500 requiring medical care, 1,500 were hospitalized, 600 of them in Tehran. The other 3,000 were treated as outpatients and discharged.  Many of these 3,000 victims left the city for the villages and attempted to treat themselves using traditional medicines; the lack of documentation of their exposure and treatment lead to difficulty in obtaining government benefits. 
 
Included among the 4,500 casualties requiring medical attention were some of the rescuers. 

By 2007, 130 people (109 civilians, 21 military) had died as a result of the attack. Of the civilians who died, 39 were under 18 years of age, including 11 under the age of 5, and 34 were women or girls.

Many of the 95% who survived the Sardasht gas attack developed serious long-term complications over the next few years, including serious respiratory problems, eye lesions, skin problems, and immune system problems.

Response

Iran announced this (chemical) assault on Sardasht as an inhumane attack and named Sardasht as the first city which was the victim of chemical armament in the world after the Atomic bombings of Hiroshima and Nagasaki.

In April 2004, the Tehran Public Court ruled that the United States government was liable for the attacks due to its support Saddam Hussein's government. The US government was ordered to pay $600 million compensation to the victims.

On 28 June 2004, in commemoration of the martyrs of the chemical bombing of Sardasht and the anniversary of the National day of the fight against weapons of mass destruction, one of the streets of Sardasht was named Hiroshima. A Japanese delegation from Nagasaki and Hiroshima talked at the ceremony. 111 white pigeons were released into the sky at the site of the victims. In the city of Hiroshima, a street is named after Sardasht, and every year the mayor of Hiroshima sends a message on the occasion of 28 June, and a group of Iranian NGO related to chemical disarmament travel to Japan to participate in the anniversary of the Hiroshima bombing. Iranian NGOs also has the annual exhibition in The Hague, the Netherlands, liaising with associations of victims of weapons of mass destruction in other countries, establishing a peace museum focusing on the effects of chemical weapons, membership in the International Network of Peace Museums, participation in the anniversary of Hiroshima and Nagasaki in Japan.

See also

 Sardasht, West Azerbaijan
 Iraq chemical attacks against Iran
 Chemical attack on Behbahan battalion
 War of the Cities (of Iran-Iraq war)
 Halabja chemical attack
 Disabled Iranian veterans
 Iraqi chemical weapons program

References

Iraqi chemical weapons program
Chemical weapons
Iraqi war crimes
Military operations involving chemical weapons during the Iran–Iraq War
Sardasht County
Disability in Iran
Chemical weapons in the Iran–Iraq War